Li Ling (born 23 July 1967) is a paralympic athlete from China competing in category F57 throwing events.

Li Ling competed in three throwing events at the 2004 Summer Paralympics where she won silver in both the discus throw and shot put. She did not compete in the 2008 Summer Paralympics, returning to the 2012 Summer Paralympics without medal success.

References

External links
 

1967 births
Living people
Chinese female shot putters
Chinese female discus throwers
Chinese female javelin throwers
Paralympic athletes of China
Paralympic silver medalists for China
Paralympic medalists in athletics (track and field)
Athletes (track and field) at the 2004 Summer Paralympics
Athletes (track and field) at the 2012 Summer Paralympics
Medalists at the 2004 Summer Paralympics
21st-century Chinese women